The secret ballot, also known as the Australian ballot, is a voting method in which a voter's identity in an election or a referendum is anonymous. This forestalls attempts to influence the voter by intimidation, blackmailing, and potential vote buying. This system is one means of achieving the goal of political privacy.

Secret ballots are used in conjunction with various voting systems. The most basic form of a secret ballot utilizes blank pieces of paper upon which each voter writes their choice. Without revealing the votes to anyone, the voter folds the ballot paper in half and places it in a sealed box. This box is later emptied for counting. An aspect of secret voting is the provision of a voting booth to enable the voter to write on the ballot paper without others being able to see what is being written. Today, printed ballot papers are usually provided, with the names of the candidates or questions and respective check boxes. Provisions are made at the polling place for the voters to record their preferences in secret, and the ballots are designed to eliminate bias and to prevent anyone from linking voter to ballot.

A privacy problem arises with moves to improve efficiency of voting by the introduction of postal voting and remote electronic voting. Some countries permit proxy voting, but some people argue that this is inconsistent with voting privacy. Popularity of the ballot selfie has challenged the secrecy of in-person voting.

Secret vs. public methods

The secret ballot became commonplace for individual citizens in liberal democracies worldwide by the late 20th century.

Votes taken by elected officials are typically public so that citizens can judge officials' and former officials' voting records in future elections. This may be done with a physical or electronic in-person system or through a roll call vote. Some faster legislative voting methods do not record who voted which way, though witnesses in the legislative chambers may still notice a given legislator's vote. These include voice votes where the volume of shouting for or against is taken as a measure of numerical support, and counting of raised hands. In some cases, a secret ballot is used, for example to allow representatives to choose party leadership without fear of retaliation against those voting for losing candidates. The parliamentary tactics of forcing or avoiding a roll call vote can be used to discourage or encourage representatives to vote in a manner that is politically unpopular among constituents (for example if a policy considered to be in the public interest is difficult to explain or unpopular but without a better alternative, or to hide pandering to a special interest) or to create or prevent fodder for political campaigns.

Public methods of citizen voting have included:
 Oral proclamation, where votes are shouted out one at a time, usually at an assembly
 Going to a particular area at an assembly, such as a town meeting or the Iowa caucus. This is the origin of the term poll for an election, originally meaning "top of the head" which is what was being counted at these assemblies.
 Small balls or other objects, such as corn, pebbles, beans, bullets, colored marbles, or cards. This is the origin of the term ballot, originally meaning "small ball".
 Raising of hands at an assembly
 Cutting a brightly colored ballot (with the color corresponding to the party of choice) out of a newspaper and bringing it to a polling place
 An open ballot system

Private methods of citizen voting have included:
 Writing the name of the preferred candidate or outcome on a piece of paper and putting it in a container (which excludes illiterate voters)
 Marking a government-printed ballot (which may exclude illiterate voters if they only include words and cannot get assistance, but some ballots include colors, symbols, or pictures to avoid this)

History

Ancient
In ancient Greece, secret ballots were used in several situations like ostracism and also to remain hidden from people seeking favors. In early 5th century BC the secrecy of ballot at ecclesia was not the primary concern, but more of a consequence of using ballots to accurately count the votes. Secret ballot was introduced into public life of Athens during second half of the fifth century.

In ancient Rome, the Tabellariae Leges (English: Ballot Laws) were a series of four laws that implemented secret ballots for votes cast regarding each of the major elected assemblies of the Roman Republic. Three of the four laws were put in place in relatively quick succession with one each in the years 139 BC, 137 BC and 131 BC, applying respectively to the elections of magistrates, jury deliberations excepting charges of treason as well as the passage of laws. The final of the four laws was implemented more than two decades later in 107 BC and served solely to expand the law passed in 137 BC to require secret ballots for all jury deliberations, including treason.

Prior to these ballot laws, one was required to provide their vote verbally to an individual responsible for tallying the votes, which effectively made every voter's vote publicly known. Mandating secret ballots had the effect of reducing the influence of the Roman aristocracy who were capable of influencing elections through a combination of bribes and threats. Secret balloting helps assuage both of those concerns, as not only are one's peers unable to determine which way you voted, there is additionally no proof that could be produced that you did vote certain way, perhaps contravening directions .

France
Article 31 of the Constitution of the Year III of the Revolution (1795) states that "All elections are to be held by secret ballot". The same goes with the constitution of 1848: voters could hand-write the name of their preferred candidate on their ballot at home (the only condition was to write on white paper) or receive one distributed on the street. The ballot was folded in order to prevent other people from reading its contents.

Louis-Napoléon Bonaparte attempted to abolish the secret ballot for the 1851 plebiscite with an electoral decree requesting electors to write down "yes" or "no" (in French: "oui" or "non") under the eyes of everyone. But he faced strong opposition and finally changed his mind, allowing the secret ballot to take place.

According to the official web site of the Assemblée nationale (the lower house of the French parliament), the voting booth was permanently adopted only in 1913.

United Kingdom

The demand for a secret ballot was one of the six points of Chartism. The British parliament of the time refused to even consider the Chartist demands, but it is noted that Lord Macaulay, in his speech of 1842, while rejecting Chartism's six points as a whole, admitted that the secret ballot was one of the two points he could support.

The London School Board election of 1870 was the first large-scale election by secret ballot in Britain.

After several failed attempts (several of them spearheaded by George Grote), the secret ballot was eventually extended generally in the Ballot Act 1872, substantially reducing the cost of campaigning (as treating was no longer realistically possible) and was first used on 15 August 1872 to re-elect Hugh Childers as MP for Pontefract in a ministerial by-election following his appointment as Chancellor of the Duchy of Lancaster. The original ballot box, sealed in wax with a licorice stamp, is held at Pontefract museum.

However, the UK uses numbered ballots in order to allow courts to intervene, under rare circumstances, to identify which candidate voters voted for.

Australia and New Zealand

In Australia, secret balloting appears to have been first implemented in Tasmania on 7 February 1856.

Until the original Tasmanian Electoral Act 1856 was "re-discovered" recently, credit for the first implementation of the secret ballot often went to Victoria, where it was pioneered by the former mayor of Melbourne, William Nicholson, and simultaneously South Australia. Victoria enacted legislation for secret ballots on 19 March 1856, and South Australian Electoral Commissioner William Boothby generally gets credit for creating the system finally enacted into law in South Australia on 2 April of that same year (a fortnight later). The other British colonies in Australia followed: New South Wales (1858), Queensland (1859), and Western Australia (1877).

State electoral laws, including the secret ballot, applied for the first election of the Australian Parliament in 1901, and the system has continued to be a feature of federal elections and referendums. 
The Commonwealth Electoral Act 1918 does not explicitly set out the secret ballot but a reading of sections  206, 207, 325, 327 of the Act would imply its assumption. Sections 323 and 226(4) do however, apply the principle of a secret ballot to polling staff and would also support the assumption.

New Zealand implemented secret voting in 1870.

United States

Before the final years of the 19th century, partisan newspapers printed filled-out ballots which party workers distributed on election day so voters could drop them directly into the boxes. Individual states moved to secret ballots soon after the presidential election of 1884, finishing with Kentucky in 1891 when it quit using an oral ballot.

Initially however, a state's new ballot did not necessarily have all four components of an "Australian ballot":
 an official ballot being printed at public expense,
 on which the names of the nominated candidates of all parties and all proposals appear,
 being distributed only at the polling place and
 being marked in secret.

After ballots are cast and no longer identifiable to the voter, several states make the ballots and copies of them available to the public, so the public can check counts and do other research with the anonymous ballots.

Louisville, Kentucky, was the first city in the United States to adopt the Australian ballot. It was drafted by Lewis Naphtali Dembitz, the uncle of and inspiration for future Supreme Court associate justice Louis Brandeis. Massachusetts adopted the first state-wide Australian ballot, written by reformer Richard Henry Dana III, in 1888. Consequently, it is also known as the "Massachusetts ballot". Seven states did not have government-printed ballots until the 20th century. Georgia started using them in 1922. When South Carolina followed suit, in 1950, this completed the nationwide switch to Australian ballots. The 20th century also brought the first criminal prohibitions against buying votes, in 1925.

While U.S. elections are now held primarily by secret ballot, there are a few exceptions:

 North Carolina has a confidential ballot, but not a secret ballot for early in-person voting (one-stop) and absentee-by-mail voting. General Statute § 163-227.5 states that the "ballot shall have a ballot number on it in accordance with G.S. 163-230.1(a2), or shall have an equivalent identifier to allow for retrievability." If a voter casts an absentee ballot or votes at a one-stop site (early voting) or absentee-by-mail, but it is discovered that the voter was ineligible (ex. died between casting ballot and election day), the ballot would be retrieved using a unique number written at the top of the ballot. Each county Election Director maintains a database with the names of each voter and associated retrievable ballot number.
Mail-in ballots do not meet the definition of Australian ballots, as they are distributed to voters’ homes, and there is no guarantee that they are marked secretly. They may be used as absentee ballots, and Colorado, Oregon, and Washington conduct all elections by mail.
In some U.S. states, a political party nominating caucus requires an open ballot system. This includes, most notably, the leadoff Presidential nominating state of Iowa.
The Constitution of West Virginia specifies that voters may choose to cast an open ballot, though they must also have the option to cast a secret ballot.

International law
The right to hold elections by secret ballot is included in numerous treaties and international agreements that obligate their signatory states:
 Article 21.3 of the Universal Declaration of Human Rights states, "The will of the people...shall be expressed in periodic and genuine elections which...shall be held by secret vote or by equivalent free voting procedures."
 Article 23 of the American Convention on Human Rights (the Pact of San Jose, Costa Rica) grants to every citizen of member states of the Organization of American States the right and opportunity "to vote and to be elected in genuine periodic elections, which shall be by universal and equal suffrage and by secret ballot that guarantees the free expression of the will of the voters".
 Paragraph 7.4 of the Document of the Copenhagen Meeting of the Conference on the Human Dimension of the CSCE, obligates the member states of the Organization for Security and Cooperation in Europe to "ensure that votes are cast by secret ballot or by equivalent free voting procedure, and that they are counted and reported honestly with the official results made public."
 Article 5 of the Convention on the Standards of Democratic Elections, Electoral Rights and Freedoms in the Member States of the Commonwealth of Independent States obligates electoral bodies not to perform "any action violating the principle of voter's secret will expression."
Article 29 of the Convention on the Rights of Persons with Disabilities requires that all Contracting States protect "the right of persons with disabilities to vote by secret ballot in elections and public referendums"

Disabled people

Ballot design and polling place architecture often deny the disabled the possibility to cast a vote in secret. In many democracies disabled persons may vote by appointing another person who is allowed to join them in the voting booth and fill the ballot in their name. This does not assure secrecy of the ballot.

The United Nations Convention on the Rights of Persons with Disabilities which entered into force in 2008 assures secret ballot for disabled voters. Article 29 of the Convention requires that all Contracting States protect "the right of the person with disabilities to vote by secret ballot in elections and public referendums". According to this provision, each Contracting State should provide for voting equipment which would enable disabled voters to vote independently and secretly. Some democracies, e.g. the United States, the Netherlands, Slovenia, Albania or India allow disabled voters to use electronic voting machines. In others, among them Azerbaijan, Canada, Ghana, the United Kingdom, and most African and Asian countries, visually impaired voters can use ballots in Braille or paper ballot templates. Article 29 also requires that Contracting States ensure "that voting procedures, facilities and materials are appropriate, accessible and easy to understand and use." In some democracies, e.g. United Kingdom, Sweden and the United States, all the polling places already are fully accessible for disabled voters.

Secrecy exceptions

The United Kingdom secret ballot arrangements are sometimes criticized because it is possible to link a ballot paper to the voter who cast it. Each ballot paper is individually numbered and each elector also has a number. When an elector is given a ballot paper, their number is noted down on the counterfoil of the ballot paper (which also carries the ballot paper number). This means, of course, that the secrecy of the ballot is not guaranteed, if anyone can gain access to the counterfoils, which are locked away securely before the ballot boxes are opened at the count. Polling station officials colluding with election scrutineers may therefore determine how individual electors have voted.

This measure is thought to be justified as a security arrangement so that if there was an allegation of fraud, false ballot papers could be identified. The process of matching ballot papers to voters is formally permissible only if an Election Court requires it; in fact the Election Court has rarely made such an order since the secret ballot was introduced in 1872. One example was in a close local election contest in Richmond-upon-Thames in the late 1970s with three disputed ballots and a declared majority of two votes. Reportedly prisoners in a UK prison were observed identifying voters' ballot votes on a list in 2008. The legal authority for this system is set out in the Parliamentary Elections Rules in Schedule 1 of the Representation of the People Act 1983.

In the United States, most states guarantee a secret ballot. But some states, including Indiana and North Carolina, require the ability to link some ballots to voters. This may for example be used with absentee voting to retain the ability to cancel a vote if the voter dies before election day. Sometimes the number on the ballot is printed on a perforated stub which is torn off and placed on a ring (like a shower curtain ring) before the ballot is cast into the ballot box. The stubs prove that an elector has voted and ensure that they can only vote once, but the ballots themselves are both secret and anonymous. At the end of voting day, the number of ballots inside the box should match the number of stubs on the ring, certifying that every ballot was cast by a registered elector, and that none of them were lost or fabricated. Sometimes the ballots themselves are numbered, making the vote trackable. In 2012 in Colorado, this procedure was ruled legal by Federal District Judge Christine Arguello, who determined that the U.S. Constitution does not grant a right to a secret ballot.

Criticism

The journalist Lynn Landers argued that the secret ballot enabled election fraud and so should be eliminated  or supplemented with other ways of verifying voting, such as cryptographically secure receipts.

Chronology of introduction

See also
Ballot selfie
Election fraud
Knowledge falsification
Preference falsification
Voter suppression

References

External links

 The Ballot Bill [UK] - The Annual Register, 1872, page 61.

Elections
Secrecy
Voting
Ballots